Discoderus amoenus is a species of beetle in the family Carabidae. It is endemic to the United States.

References

Further reading

 
 
 

Harpalinae
Beetles described in 1863
Beetles of the United States
Taxa named by John Lawrence LeConte